Frederick or Fred Howard may refer to:

Politics
 Frederick Howard, 5th Earl of Carlisle (1748–1825), English diplomat
 Frederick John Howard (1814–1897), British Member of Parliament for Youghal
 Frederick George Howard (1805–1834), British Member of Parliament for Morpeth

Sports
 Frederick Howard (footballer), English footballer active in the 1920s with Derby County, Gillingham and Ayr United
 Fred Howard (Australian footballer) (1878–1942), Australian rules footballer
 Fred Howard (footballer, born 1893) (1893–?), English footballer active in the 1910s and 1920s
 Fred Howard (baseball) (born 1956), American baseball player

Other
 Frederick Howard (industrialist) (1827–1915), British industrialist
 Frederick Howard (British Army officer) (1785–1815), fought in the Napoleonic Wars and was killed at the Battle of Waterloo